Kenneth Roy Thomson, 2nd Baron Thomson of Fleet (September 1, 1923 – June 12, 2006), known in Canada as Ken Thomson, was a Canadian/British  businessman and art collector. At the time of his death, he was listed by Forbes as the richest person in Canada and the ninth richest person in the world, with a net worth of approximately US $19.6 billion.

Early life and career
Thomson was born on September 1, 1923, in Toronto, Ontario.  He was the son of Roy Thomson, the founder of the Thomson Corporation.

Thomson was first educated at Upper Canada College before going up to St. John's College, Cambridge, where he received a degree in economics and law. During World War II, he served in the Royal Canadian Air Force. Following the war, he completed his education and entered the family business.

Business owner
Upon his father's death in 1976, Thomson succeeded as 2nd Lord Thomson of Fleet. However, Thomson never used his noble title in Canada or took up his seat in the House of Lords. In a 1980 interview with Saturday Night magazine, he said, "In London I'm Lord Thomson, in Toronto I'm Ken. I have two sets of Christmas cards and two sets of stationery. You might say I'm having my cake and eating it too. I'm honouring a promise to my father by being Lord Thomson, and at the same time I can just be Ken."

He succeeded his father as chair of what was then a media empire made up of extensive newspaper and television holdings. The Thomson family also owned a controlling stake in the Hudson's Bay Company from 1979 to 1997. The Thomson media empire added The Globe and Mail in Toronto to The Times and Sunday Times in Britain and The Jerusalem Post in Israel. Under Thomson, the corporation sold its North Sea oil holdings and sold The Times to Rupert Murdoch's  News Corporation and the Jerusalem Post to Conrad Black's Hollinger Inc. The Globe and Mail was combined with BCE's cable and television assets (including CTV and The Sports Network) to form Bell Globemedia, controlled by BCE with Thomson as a minority shareholder. The company then sold all of its community newspapers to become a financial data services giant and one of the world's most powerful information services and academic publishing companies. Today, the company operates primarily in the US from its headquarters in Stamford, Connecticut. In 2002, The Thomson Corporation was listed on the New York Stock Exchange as "TOC".

According to Forbes magazine in 2005, the Thomson family is the richest in Canada, and Lord Thomson of Fleet was the fifteenth richest person in the world, with a personal net worth of US $17.9 billion. Between the time of that report and his death, he jumped six positions to ninth with assets of almost $22.6 billion.

Over the past fifty years, Thomson distinguished himself as one of North America's leading art collectors and has been a major benefactor to the Art Gallery of Ontario. In 2002, he paid the highest price ever for a Canadian painting when he purchased Paul Kane's Scene in the Northwest: Portrait of John Henry Lefroy. At a Sotheby's auction that year, Thomson purchased Peter Paul Rubens' painting The Massacre of the Innocents for £49.5 million (CAD $117 million).

Personal life
In 1956, Thomson married Nora Marilyn Lavis (July 27, 1930 – May 23, 2017), a model. They had three children: David (born 1957), Lynne, who changed her name to Taylor (born 1959), and Peter (born 1965). Taylor, a one-time actress and film producer, became known for her lawsuit against Christie's auction house, when in 1994 she bought urns supposedly from Louis XV of France that were discovered instead to be 19th century reproductions.

Retirement
In 2002, Thomson stepped down as chairman of Thomson Corporation, installing his elder son, David. He retained his positions as Chairman of The Woodbridge Company, the family's holding company, which owned a controlling share of Thomson Corporation. Following his retirement from active business, he donated to the Art Gallery of Ontario nearly 2,000 art works worth more than US $300 million, representing the finest private art collection in Canada. His gift contained masterpieces by renowned Canadian artists plus those from his collection of European works of art dating from the Middle Ages to the mid-nineteenth century, including Rubens' Massacre of the Innocents.

In his final years, Thomson lived at 8 Castle Frank Road in the Rosedale area. He died in 2006 at his Toronto office of an apparent heart attack.

Arms

See also
Canadian Hereditary Peers

References

External links
Forbes Magazine profile in 2006
Forbes Magazine – 25 richest people in 2006

Thomson of Fleet, Kenneth Thomson, 2nd Baron
Thomson of Fleet, Kenneth Thomson, 2nd Baron
Thomson of Fleet, Kenneth Thomson, 2nd Baron
Thomson of Fleet, Kenneth Thomson, 2nd Baron
Businesspeople from Toronto
Thomson of Fleet, Kenneth Thomson, 2nd Baron
Thomson of Fleet, Kenneth Thomson, 2nd Baron
Canadian expatriates in the United Kingdom
Thomson of Fleet, Kenneth Thomson, 2nd Baron
Thomson of Fleet, Kenneth Thomson, 2nd Baron
Canadian people of English descent
Canadian people of Scottish descent
Canadian socialites
20th-century Canadian newspaper publishers (people)
21st-century Canadian newspaper publishers (people)
Kenneth
Upper Canada College alumni
Gardiner family
Canadian peers
Thomson of Fleet